Pitcairnia steyermarkii is a plant species in the genus Pitcairnia. This species is endemic to Venezuela.

References

steyermarkii
Flora of Venezuela